Rajić may refer to:

 Rajić (surname), a Slavic surname
 Rajić, Sisak-Moslavina County, a village near Novska, Croatia
 Rajić, Bjelovar-Bilogora County, a village near Bjelovar, Croatia